Jeffrey Bernard Foote (born July 14, 1987) is an American professional basketball player.

College career
Foote began his college basketball career at St. Bonaventure University. He redshirted his freshman season before he transferred to Cornell University for his last three seasons.

Professional career
In June 2010, Foote signed a three-year contract with Euroleague giants Maccabi Tel Aviv. In November 2010 he was sent on a one-year loan to Spanish second division team Melilla Baloncesto. In August 2011 he signed a one-year contract with Zastal Zielona Góra. Foote left Zastal before the season started and in December 2011 signed with the Springfield Armor of the NBA Development League. After the resolution of the 2011 NBA lockout, Foote was invited to the Portland Trail Blazers training camp in December 2011, but did not make the team and returned to the Armor.

On March 8, 2012, Foote was called up to the NBA by the New Orleans Hornets. In his first game for the Hornets on March 9 Foote scored four points and had four rebounds. He would appear in three more games that season but would not score another point.

On September 7, 2012, Foote signed with the Lithuanian club Žalgiris Kaunas.

On November 1, 2013, he was re-acquired by the Springfield Armor.

Personal
Foote graduated from the College of Agriculture and Life Sciences at Cornell University. He is the son of Don and Wanda Foote. Don played basketball at Niagara University from 1976 to 1979. Foote's older brother, Jesse, played basketball for Rochester Institute of Technology from 2001 to 2005 and holds RIT's record for career blocked shots.

Currently, Foote is enrolled in law school at the University of Miami and works as a graduate assistant for the basketball team under Head Coach Jim Larranaga.

Awards and accomplishments

College career
All-Ivy First-Team (2010)
2x All-Ivy Second-Team (2008, 2009)
2x Ivy League Defensive Player of the Year (2009, 2010)

References

External links
 Cornell Big Red bio
 St. Bonaventure Bonnies bio
 Jeff Foote Draft Prospects Profile at NBA.com

1987 births
Living people
American expatriate basketball people in Israel
American expatriate basketball people in Lithuania
American expatriate basketball people in Spain
American men's basketball players
Basketball players from New York (state)
BC Žalgiris players
Centers (basketball)
Cornell Big Red men's basketball players
Maccabi Tel Aviv B.C. players
Melilla Baloncesto players
New Orleans Hornets players
People from Tioga County, New York
Springfield Armor players
Undrafted National Basketball Association players